Pick-up sticks is a game of physical and mental skill.

Pick-up sticks or its variations may also refer to:

Pick-Up Sticks (novel), children's novel by Sarah Ellis
Pick-up sticks (Haida), playing sticks made by the Haida people
"Pick Up Sticks", song by The Dave Brubeck Quartet from their album Time Out
Pick Up Stix, an Asian restaurant